The Honda CB125E is a 125cc four-stroke commuter motorcycle, manufactured by the Honda Motor Company. It has electric start and a five-speed gearbox. The bike is equipped with front disc and rear drum brakes. Electrics are 12 volt with capacitor discharge electronic ignition and the machine is electric start only.

Although good for city commuting, the bike lacks power and speed to keep up with free-way speeds in Australia.

It went on sale in Australia in 2012 and became one of the most reasonably priced road bikes.

External links

http://www.honda-cb125.com/honda-cb125e-specifications.html
http://motorcycles.honda.com.au/Naked/CB125E

CB125E
Motorcycles introduced in 2012
Standard motorcycles